Adnan Marić (born 17 February 1997) is a Swedish footballer who plays for Jönköpings Södra. He made his debut in an FA Cup match against Notts County on 6 February 2018.

Maric's mother club is Gunnilse IS. He played eight matches in the 2012 season in Division 2 Västra Götaland.

In January 2013, he signed a three-year contract with an option for another year with Gais. On 16 February 2014 he scored his first goal for Gais A team in a training match against the Norwegian East Side as Gais water with 3–1.

In April 2014, he signed for the Welsh Premier League club Swansea City's youth team. In March 2016, he extended his contract for three years.

On 14 December 2021, Marić signed a two-year deal with Jönköpings Södra.

Career statistics

References

External links 
 

1997 births
Living people
Swansea City A.F.C. players
Association football midfielders
Swedish footballers
Swedish people of Bosnia and Herzegovina descent
Footballers from Gothenburg
Swedish expatriate footballers
Expatriate footballers in Wales
Swedish expatriate sportspeople in the United Kingdom
Superettan players
GAIS players
Sweden youth international footballers
BK Häcken players
Jönköpings Södra IF players
Allsvenskan players